Jérôme Cintas (born 11 April 1971) is a French former professional footballer who played as a defender.

External links

1971 births
Living people
French footballers
Association football defenders
Olympique Alès players
Tours FC players
FC Mulhouse players
Ligue 2 players
Montauban FCTG players